James Metecan Birsen (born April 6, 1995) is a Turkish professional basketball player for Fenerbahçe of the Turkish Super League (BSL) and the EuroLeague.

Professional career
Birsen grew up with the Fenerbahçe Ülker juniors team and he made his debut with Fenerbahçe during the 2011–12 season. On 26 August 2014, he was loaned for a season to Olin Edirne, later renamed as Eskişehir Basket. Then Olin Edirne relocated to Eskişehir as Eskişehir Basket. Over 23 Turkish League games played in the 2014–15 season, he averaged 3.1 points and 1.9 rebounds per game.

On 12 June 2018, Birsen was announced by Anadolu Efes, where he signed a 2-year contract.

On July 17, 2019, he has signed 1 year deal with Pınar Karşıyaka of the Turkish Super League.

On June 29, 2021, he has signed 2+1 year deal with Fenerbahçe of the Turkish Super League and EuroLeague.

Turkish national team
He has been member of the Turkish Under-16 and Under-18 national team. He won the bronze medal at the 2010 European U-16 Championship.

Career statistics

EuroLeague

|-
| style="text-align:left;"| 2013–14
| style="text-align:left;"| Fenerbahçe
| 8 || 1 || 5.3||.400||.000||.500||1.1||0||.4||.1||.6||.5
|- class="sortbottom"
| style="text-align:center;" colspan=2 | Career
| 8 || 1 || 5.3||.400||.000||.500||1.1||0||.4||.1||.6||.5

Personal life
He was born to a Turkish father and an Irish mother.

References

External links

 Metecan Birsen at draftexpress.com
 Metecan Birsen at eurobasket.com
 Metecan Birsen at euroleague.net
 James Metecan Birsen at fiba.com
 Metecan Birsen at tblstat.net
 

1995 births
Living people
2019 FIBA Basketball World Cup players
Anadolu Efes S.K. players
Eskişehir Basket players
Fenerbahçe men's basketball players
İstanbul Büyükşehir Belediyespor basketball players
Karşıyaka basketball players
People from Kadıköy
Sakarya BB players
Small forwards
Basketball players from Istanbul
Turkish men's basketball players
Turkish people of Irish descent